Vitalis of Assisi, O.S.B. (1295 – 31 May 1370) was an Italian hermit and monk.

Origin
Born in Bastia Umbra, Vitalis as a youth was licentious and immoral; however, he attempted to expiate his sins by going on pilgrimage to various sanctuaries in Italy and Europe. When he returned to Umbria, he became a Benedictine monk at Subiaco.

Life
Vitalis then spent the rest of his life in the hermitage of Santa Maria di Viole, near Assisi, in utter poverty. His one possession was an old container that he used to drink water from a nearby spring. His reputation for holiness soon spread after his death. He was known as a patron against sicknesses and diseases affecting the bladder and genitals.

Legacy

On 29 May 2011, a head preserved as a relic, allegedly that of Vitalis, was offered at auction with an estimate of €1,000 at Annesbrook House, Duleek, County Meath, Ireland. It was sold to Billy Jamieson for €3,500.

In November 2016 the relic was once again purchased by an antiquities and oddities collector, and permanently resides in a private gallery located in the Eastern United States.

Notes 

1295 births
1370 deaths
Italian Benedictines
Italian hermits
Benedictine saints
People from Assisi
14th-century Christian saints
Italian Roman Catholic saints